Klietz is a municipality in the district of Stendal, in Saxony-Anhalt, Germany. In January 2010 it absorbed the former municipality Neuermark-Lübars.

References

Municipalities in Saxony-Anhalt
Stendal (district)